South Buton Regency is a regency located in Southeast Sulawesi. This regency was formed from the southern part of Buton Regency, from which it was separated by Act No.16 of 2014, dated 23 July 2014. It covers an area of 546.58 km2, and the population of the districts now comprising the new regency was 74,974 at the 2010 Census and 95,261 at the 2020 Census; the official estimate as at mid 2021 was 95,472. The regency capital is located in Batauga.

The Regency contains three districts in the south of Buton Island (bordered by Buton Regency, the city of Baubau, and the Flores Sea), as well as 17 islands (the largest being Kadatua, Siompu and Batu Abas) lying to the west and to the south of Buton Island.

Administrative districts
South Buton Regency is divided into the following seven districts (kecamatan), with their areas and populations at the 2010 Census and the 2020 Census, together with the official estimates as at mid 2021. The table also includes the locations of the district administrative centres, the number of villages (rural ;desa and urban kelurahan) in each district, and its post code.

Notes: 
(a) includes Batumandawu Dua, Batumandawu Satu, La Kuteeno and Labuani islets.
(b) includes offshore islets of Bungi Napa, Bungi Salata, Kaliwu Liwuto, Liwuto, Kaofe Kansopa and Kaofe Matagholeo.
(c) includes offshore Liwutongkidi islet.
(d) includes Kawikawia, Kawikawia Bara, Kawikawia Timbu and Waruata islets.

References

External links 
 

Regencies of Southeast Sulawesi
2014 establishments in Indonesia